DNA-OS is a French-made operating system to supersede MutekA, an obsolete operating system, while still providing POSIX thread API. As said on the SoCLib website, "It is a kernel-mode lightweight operating system for Multiprocessor System on a Chip. It is built on top of a thin HAL to ease porting on new platforms and processor architecture. DNA/OS does not support virtual memory."

DNA-OS is a layered microkernel operating system, written in C99, released under the GNU GPLv3 license.

Target hardware / software 

 ARM7, ARM9, Cortex A8/A9
 MIPS
 Micro Blaze
 SparcV8
 NiOS

OS flavours 

 SMP (Symmetric multiprocessing)
 DS (Distributed Scheduling)

Associated libraries 

 Native POSIX Threads
 Newlibc

References

Lightweight Unix-like systems
Microkernels